Medinophyto is a genus of bristle flies in the family Tachinidae.

Species
Medinophyto dilecta (Wiedemann, 1830)
Medinophyto histrio (Aldrich, 1928)

References

Dexiinae
Diptera of South America
Taxa named by Charles Henry Tyler Townsend
Tachinidae genera